Pachycentrata is an extinct genus of prehistoric amphibian.

Pachycentrata fossils have been found in the In Beceten Formation located in Tahoua, Niger. 
The fossils have been dated to the late/upper Coniacian to Santonian periods.

These amphibians are anurans, of the family Pipidae. They are distinguished by a few soft anatomical characters, namely their larvae, and many skeletal features that involve the structure of the skull and the vertebral column. Their typical size ranges from 0.8 to 1.2 in (20 to 30 mm) long up to 4.1–6.7 in (104–170 mm) long. Pachybatrachus is the oldest fossil of this family.

See also

 Prehistoric amphibian
 List of prehistoric amphibians

References

Late Cretaceous amphibians of Africa
Fossil taxa described in 2004
Pipidae
Coniacian genus first appearances
Santonian genus extinctions